Hulín is a town in Kroměříž District in the Zlín Region of the Czech Republic. It has about 6,500 inhabitants.

Administrative parts
Villages of Chrášťany and Záhlinice are administrative parts of Hulín.

Geography
It lies in a flat landscape of the Upper Morava Valley. The streams Rusava and Mojena flow through the town. The Rusava flows into the Morava River, which forms part of the southern border of the territory. There is a system of several ponds south of the town.

History
The first written mention of Hulín is from 1224, when the visit of King Ottokar I of Bohemia was documented. In 1261, the village was donated to the church by King Ottokar II of Bohemia as acknowledgement to bishop Bruno von Schauenburg for his services. Shortly after, Hulín was promoted to a town. At the end of the 13th century, a local small fortress was rebuilt to a bigger castle and the town centre was fortified with walls and a moat.

The local population subsisted mainly on agriculture. The breeding of cattle was significant. In the 1840s, the railway was built and the town slowly began to industrialize.

Demographics

Transport
The town is surrounded by motorways on two sides. The intersection of the D1 and D55 motorways is located in the northern part of the territory.

Sport
SK Spartak Hulín is a football club which played in the Moravian–Silesian Football League (third tier of Czech football system). After relegation in 2019 the club suspended its activities and since the 2020–21 season it plays in the lower amateur tiers.

Notable people
Zdeněk Nehoda (born 1952), footballer and football agent
Radek Drulák (born 1962), footballer
Zdeněk Zlámal (born 1985), footballer; grew up here

Twin towns – sister cities

Hulín is twinned with:
 Zlaté Moravce, Slovakia

References

External links

Cities and towns in the Czech Republic
Populated places in Kroměříž District